The 7th Annual GMA Dove Awards were held on 1975 recognizing accomplishments of musicians for the year 1974. The show was held in Nashville, Tennessee.

External links
 

GMA Dove Awards
1975 music awards
GMA Dove
1975 in American music
GMA